The Pure Oil Service Station in Hartwell, Georgia, on Howell St. at Jackson St., was built in 1932.  It was listed on the National Register of Historic Places in 1986.

It has also been known as White's Service Station & Muffler Shopand "Willie's Service Station and Muffler shop". It is a one-story brick structure with styling derivative of English Tudor Revival architecture.

References

Gas stations on the National Register of Historic Places in Georgia (U.S. state)
National Register of Historic Places in Hart County, Georgia
Tudor Revival architecture in the United States
Commercial buildings completed in 1932
1932 establishments in Georgia (U.S. state)
Hartwell, Georgia